Leucania ursula, the ursula wainscot, is a species of cutworm or dart moth in the family Noctuidae. It is found in North America.

The MONA or Hodges number for Leucania ursula is 10461.

References

Further reading

External links

 

Leucania
Articles created by Qbugbot
Moths described in 1936